Events in the year 2007 in the Republic of India.

Incumbents
 President of India: A. P. J. Abdul Kalam to 25 July Pratibha Patil
 Vice President of India –
 Bhairon Singh Shekhawat(till 21 July) 
 Mohammad Hamid Ansari(from 11 August) 
 Prime Minister of India: Dr. Manmohan Singh             
 Chief Justice of India – Yogesh Kumar Sabharwal until 13 January, K. G. Balakrishnan

Governors
 Andhra Pradesh – Rameshwar Thakur (until 22 August), N. D. Tiwari (starting 22 August)
 Arunachal Pradesh –     ** until 23 January: Shilendra Kumar Singh 
 23 January-6 April: M. M. Jacob
 6 April-14 April: K. Sankaranarayanan
 15 April-3 September: Shilendra Kumar Singh
 starting 3 September: K. Sankaranarayanan
 Assam – Ajai Singh
 Bihar – Buta Singh
 Chhattisgarh – Krishna Mohan Seth (until 25 January), E. S. L. Narasimhan (starting 25 January)
 Goa – S. C. Jamir
 Gujarat – Nawal Kishore Sharma
 Haryana – Akhlaqur Rahman Kidwai
 Himachal Pradesh – Vishnu Sadashiv Kokje 
 Jammu and Kashmir – Syed Sibtey Razi
 Jharkhand – S. K. Sinha 
 Karnataka – T. N. Chaturvedi (until 20 August), Rameshwar Thakur (starting 20 August)
 Kerala – R. L. Bhatia
 Madhya Pradesh – Balram Jakhar
 Maharashtra – S.M. Krishna
 Manipur – Shivinder Singh Sidhu
 Meghalaya – 
 until 11 April: M.M. Jacob 
 11 April-28 October: Banwari Lal Joshi
 starting 28 October: Shivinder Singh Sidhu
 Mizoram – M. M. Lakhera 
 Nagaland – Shyamal Datta (until 2 February), K. Sankaranarayanan (starting 2 February)
 Odisha – Rameshwar Thakur
 Punjab – Sunith Francis Rodrigues
 Rajasthan – 
 until 21 June: Pratibha Patil
 21 June-6 September: Akhlaqur Rahman Kidwai
 starting 6 September: S. K. Singh
 Sikkim – V. Rama Rao (until 25 October), Sudarshan Agarwal (starting 25 October)
 Tamil Nadu – Surjit Singh Barnala
 Tripura – Dinesh Nandan Sahay
 Uttar Pradesh – T. V. Rajeswar
 Uttarakhand – Sudarshan Agarwal (until 28 October), Banwari Lal Joshi (starting 28 October)
 West Bengal – Gopalkrishna Gandhi

Events

 National income - 48,986,621 million
 January–November – Nandigram violence – Clashes between opposition parties, the governing Communist Party of India (Marxist) and police in Nandigram, West Bengal. On 14 March, 14 villagers were killed in police firing.
 10 January – India launches four satellites at a time with their PSLV -C7 rocket, including the SRE-1 test article, which will return to Earth in a test for a future Indian human spaceflight program.
 17 January – Protests occur in India and the United Kingdom against the British series of Celebrity Big Brother after Jade Goody, Danielle Lloyd and Jo O'Meara were alleged to have been racially abusive towards Bollywood star Shilpa Shetty.
 22 January – Indian spacecraft SRE 1 successfully completes a twelve-day orbital test flight, making India one of the few nations to return a craft from orbit.
 24 January – India and Russia agree to jointly develop fifth-generation stealth fighter jets.
 18 February – 2007 Samjhauta Express bombings: Islamist militants from the Lashkar-e-Taiba organization set off a bomb on the Samjhauta Express, a twice-weekly train service connecting Delhi, India, and Lahore, Pakistan.
 20 February – A river boat carrying children on a school trip on the Periyar River in southern India capsizes, killing at least 18 students and four teachers.
 4 March – Sunil Kumar Mahato, an Indian member of parliament from the Jharkhand Mukti Morcha, is killed by suspected Maoist rebels while he was attending a local football match in Jharkhand organised to mark the Hindu festival of Holi.
 15 March – Naxalite rebels attack a police outpost in the Bijapur district of Chhattisgarh, India, killing at least 49 officers and looting their weapons.
 16 April – At least 11 people die in southern India as a passenger train runs into a minibus carrying local officials near the village of Thirumatpur in Tamil Nadu.
 18 May – 18 May 2007 Hyderabad Bombing: 9 people are killed in a bomb blast at the Mecca Masjid mosque in the Indian city of Hyderabad, India.
 19 July – Prathiba Patilis elected as the first female President of India.
 25 August – Forty-four people are dead after two bombs explode in Hyderabad.
 August – India and the United States release the text of 123 agreement. This has been very controversial in the Indian political environment with both Left and NDA opposing the UPA over the issue.
 24 September – India won the ICC t20 world cup 2007 by beating their rivals Pakistan in the final
 11 November – Miss India-Earth Pooja Chitgopekar won in Miss Earth 2007 beauty pageant as Miss Earth-Air (1st-runner up) held in Manila, Philippines.
 21 November – Calcutta – Protests over Bangladeshi feminist writer Taslima Nasreen turn into deadly riots; troops are deployed.
 22 December – Narendra Modi led government in Gujarat completes its term.
 29 December - Sunil Joshi, a Rashtriya Swayamsevak Sangh functionary shot dead in Madhya Pradesh allegedly by proponents of Saffron terror.

Births

Deaths

 27 January – Kamleshwar, writer, screenwriter, critic and essayist (b. 1932).
 28 January – O. P. Nayyar, film music director and composer (b. 1926).
 2 February – Vijay Arora, actor (b. 1946).
 4 March – Sunil Kumar Mahato, politician, assassinated (b. 1966).
 1 April – Laurie Baker, English-born architect (b. 1917)
 5 April – Leela Majumdar, writer (b. 1908).
 5 April – Poornachandra Tejaswi, writer and novelist (b. 1938).
 13 April – Dhulipala Seetharama Sastry, actor (b. 1921).
 27 May – Ibrahim Saeed, journalist, editor and scholar (b. 1945).
 27 May – G. Srinivasan, film producer (b. 1958).
 13 June – Ramchandra Gandhi, philosopher, grandson of Mahatma Gandhi (b. 1937).
 2 July – Dilip Sardesai, cricketer (b. 1940).
 8 July – Chandra Shekhar, politician, 11th Prime Minister of India (b. 1927).
 21 August – Qurratulain Hyder, novelist and short story writer, academic and journalist (b. 1926).
 10 October – S. R. Bommai, politician and Chief Minister of Karnataka (b. 1924).
 11 October – Sri Chinmoy, spiritual teacher and philosopher (b. 1931).
 27 October – Satyen Kappu, actor (b. 1931).
 21 December – Teji Bachchan, wife of poet Harivansh Rai Bachchan and mother of actor, Amitabh Bachchan.
 25 December – G. P. Sippy, film producer and director (b. 1914).

See also 

 Bollywood films of 2007

References

External links
 CII India Trade Fair
Trade Fair of India

 
Years of the 21st century in India